Lean Cuisine is a brand of frozen entrées and dinners sold in the United States and Canada by Nestlé, and in Australia by Vesco (under a licensing agreement with Nestlé).  The brand began as low-fat, low-calorie versions of Stouffer's products.  Today, Lean Cuisine includes traditional dinners, ethnic dishes, pizzas, whole-grain Spa Cuisine entreés, and panini. The headquarters of Lean Cuisine in the United States is located in Solon, Ohio, a suburb of Cleveland. 

In February 2023, Nestle Canada announced their intentions to wind down and exit the frozen meals and pizza business in the Canadian market within the next six months.  Production and sales in the United States market are not affected by this decision and will continue.

Overview and history
Lean Cuisine was created in 1981 to provide a healthier alternative to Stouffer's frozen meals. It began with ten items and has expanded to include 100+ different meals. The brand name "Lean Cuisine" is considered by the FDA as a nutrient content claim, so all Lean Cuisine items are required to meet the "lean" criteria of less than 10 g fat, 4.5 g or less saturated fat, and less than 95 mg cholesterol. Lean Cuisine items are also calorie-controlled, with most items in the 200–300 calorie range, with a minimum of 140 calories and a maximum of 400 calories.

A major competitor of Lean Cuisine is Healthy Choice, manufactured by Conagra Brands. It is required to meet "healthy" criteria by the FDA, since it includes "healthy" in its brand name. This includes a requirement to be below 480 mg of sodium in addition to fat, saturated fat, and cholesterol targets. Other competitors include Smart Ones, made by H. J. Heinz Company, and South Beach Diet, made by Kraft Heinz.  There are also a number of store brand competitors, such as Safeway's Eating Right brand, Easy Meals and Optislim.

Lean Cuisine sponsors Susan G. Komen for the Cure and America on the Move.

Varieties

Timeline
1981 – Brand launched with 10 items and launch communication focuses on "Good tasting entrees at less than 300 calories."
1983 – Tagline adopted "You'll love the way it looks on you" and strong demand leads to product shortages and apologies in print ads to consumers
1984 – Lean Cuisine 14-day diet plan, free booklet called "On Your Way to Being Lean" and another tagline "It's not just the calories that count, it's the taste"
1985 – Product line expanded to 18 items and tagline was "You'll love the taste.  And you'll love the way it looks on you"
1986 – With competition entering category, tagline was "Only Lean Cuisine tastes like Lean Cuisine"
1987 – Product line expanded to 25 items, including shrimp, lamb, and veal items, Tagline "More Satisfaction", and directly targeted Weight Watchers dieters by publishing Weight Watchers exchanges for all items
1991 – Launched 11 new items, focused on low fat message, like "98% fat free!"
1992 – Launched 8 new items, including Honey Mustard Chicken, which contained a jar of Grey Poupon
1993 – Launched 8 more new items, including pot pies and enchilada
1995 – Launched Lunch Express- lower price option, eat from the box and tagline "Time to treat yourself right" and "It's not just Lean, it's Cuisine"
1996 – Launched Cafe Classics- more restaurant-inspired meals and look
1997 – Launched American Favorites- more homestyle classic American dishes
1998 – Launched four new Cafe Classics items
1999 – Launched Skillet Sensations- bag "kit" meals that cook in a pan
2000 – First mention of tagline "Do something good for yourself" in communications
2001 – Launch of Zesty Selections items- more spicy, flavorful dishes
2002 – Launch of Bowls and Dinnertime Selects
2003 – Launch of Asian product lines and pizzas
2004 – Launch of Low carb entrees, deep dish pizzas, and tagline "It's not just Lean, it's Cuisine" gone, replaced with "Do Something Good for Yourself"
2005 – Launch of Spa Cuisine- whole grain entreés and Dinnertime Selects with dessert
2006 – Preservatives eliminated from most (80+) items, launch of Panini sandwiches and Brick Oven style pizzas
2007 – Launch of five Spa Cuisine items with twice the vegetables and two additional panini sandwiches
2008 – Launch of four Flatbread melts
2010 – "The Book of Truth" campaign debuts
2018 - Launch of vegan frozen meals

References

External links

 

Nestlé brands
Brand name diet products
Frozen food brands
Products introduced in 1981